Coreopsis californica is a North American species of tickseed in the family Asteraceae.

Distribution
Coreopsis californica var. californica is found in dry habitats of California (U.S.) and Baja California state in northwestern (Mexico). The plant grows in the washes of the San Joaquin Valley, southern Inner California Coast Ranges, and Transverse Ranges; and bajadas of the Mojave Desert,  Colorado Desert, and Sonoran Desert.

Description
Coreopsis californica is an annual herb up to 30 cm (12 inches) tall. The yellow flower heads have both ray florets and disc florets and appear from March to May.

References

External links
Jepson Manual treatment for Coreopsis californica var. californica

californica
Flora of California
Flora of Baja California
Flora of the California desert regions
Flora of the Sonoran Deserts
Natural history of the California chaparral and woodlands
Natural history of the Colorado Desert
Natural history of the Mojave Desert
Natural history of the Transverse Ranges
Plants described in 1841
Flora without expected TNC conservation status